Graham George Able (born 28 July 1947) is an English educationalist who was the Master at Dulwich College from 1997 until his retirement in 2009.

Early life
He was educated at Worksop College and went on to study Natural Sciences at Trinity College, Cambridge, where he received his MA in 1968. In 1969 he completed his PGCE and married Mary Susan Munro with whom he has a son, and a daughter.

Career
After completing his PGCE in 1969 Graham Able went on to teach at Sutton Valence School. In 1976 he became the Boarding Housemaster and he continued in this role until his departure in 1983. In 1983 he also completed an MA in Social Sciences from Durham University. In that year he took up the position of Second Master at Barnard Castle School and in 1988 he left Barnard Castle School and went on to become the Headmaster of Hampton School. During his time at Hampton School he jointly published ‘'Head to Head'’ in 1992, became a Fellow of the Royal Society of Arts in 1994, and MIoD in 1995. In 1996 he left Hampton School and took up the position of Master of Dulwich College in 1997. He retired in the Summer of 2009.

During his time at Dulwich College Graham Able was co-chairman of the HMC and GSA Education and Academic Policy Committee (from 1998 to 2001). In 2003 he was chairman of the HMC. Since 1998 he has been on the Edexcel Foundation Council, on the Council and Court of ICSTM since 1999 and on the Council of Roedean School since 2000.

In 2010, Graham Able took up the position of Chief Executive of the Alpha Plus Group, an education company that owns a number of schools and colleges in the UK.

His love of cricket is epitomised by his membership of the MCC and he is also an honorary member of the East India Club.

Publications
Head to Head (jointly) - 1992
Head to HoD (jointly) - 1998

References

1947 births
People educated at Worksop College
Alumni of Trinity College, Cambridge
English educational theorists
Masters of Dulwich College
Living people
Alumni of Durham University Graduate Society